George H. "Foghorn" Bradley (July 1, 1855 – March 31, 1900) was an American umpire in Major League Baseball for six full seasons who was born in Medford, Massachusetts. He also played one season in the National League.

Playing career
He started 21 of the team's last 22 games that season, becoming the team's ace. His totals for the season included nine wins and 10 losses in 22 games pitched. He started 21 games, completing 16 of them including one shutout. After the season, Wright signed Tommy Bond, and Bradley suspected that he would be the team's new ace, so he signed a lucrative minor league contract and left the National League, never to return as a player.

Umpiring career
He did not get promoted to full-time umpire until , when he officiated games in the National League until . During that era umpires generally worked games single-handedly, and Bradley was no exception, as he worked as the lone umpire in every game of his career.

Although his career as an umpire was short, he was involved a couple of historic games. On June 12, 1880, he was the umpire when Lee Richmond pitched the first perfect game in major league history, which was also the second no-hitter ever tossed. Later, in that same season, on August 20, he was the umpire for another no-hitter, this time by future Hall of Famer Pud Galvin, throwing the fifth no-hitter in major league history.

In total, he officially umpired in 344 games, during an era in which more than one umpire was rarely used in games. Foghorn died in Philadelphia at the age of 44, and was buried in the Philadelphia Cemetery; he was later re-buried in Forest Hills Cemetery in Huntingdon Valley, Pennsylvania.

References

External links

1855 births
1900 deaths
Major League Baseball pitchers
19th-century baseball players
19th-century baseball umpires
Boston Red Caps players
Baseball players from Massachusetts
Sportspeople from Medford, Massachusetts
Major League Baseball umpires